Jeff Hughes (born May 17, 1988) is an American mixed martial artist. A professional since 2014, he has also fought in the Ultimate Fighting Championship and Legacy Fighting Alliance, where he was a former heavyweight champion.

Background
Hughes was born and raised in Canton, Ohio. He played basketball and wrestled in high school. He then turned to MMA after he graduated from high school in his hometown of Canton, Ohio.

Mixed martial arts career

Early career 
After compiling an amateur record of 11-3 from 2007 until 2013, Hughes started his professional MMA career in 2014 and fought under numerous organizations, notably Legacy Fighting Alliance where he was the Heavyweight Champion twice. He amassed a record of 9-1 before competing in Dana White's Contender Series 14.

Dana White's Contender Series 
Hughes appeared in Dana White's Contender Series 14 web-series program on July 24, 2018, facing Josh Appelt. He won the fight via first-round TKO. With this win, Hughes was awarded a contract with the UFC.

Ultimate Fighting Championship

Hughes made his UFC debut on March 9, 2019 at UFC Fight Night 146 against Daniel Spitz. However, Spitz pulled out of the fight in February citing injury and he was replaced by Maurice Greene. He lost the fight via a split decision.

Hughes faced Todd Duffee on September 14, 2019 at UFC Fight Night 158. The bout ended in the first round as a no contest due to an accidental eye poke that rendered Duffee unable to continue.

Hughes faced Raphael Pessoa on October 26, 2019 at UFC Fight Night 162. He lost the fight via unanimous decision.

Hughes was expected to face promotional newcomer Carlos Felipe on March 14, 2020 at UFC Fight Night 170. Due to the COVID-19 pandemic, the event was eventually postponed .

Hughes faced Juan Espino on September 27, 2020 at UFC 253. He lost the fight via submission in round one.

On October 2, 2020 it was reported that Hughes was released by the UFC.

Championships and accomplishments
Legacy Fighting Alliance
Legacy Fighting Alliance Heavyweight Champion (Two times)

Mixed martial arts record

|-
|Loss
|align=center|10–4 (1)
|Juan Espino
|Submission (scarf hold choke)
|UFC 253
|
|align=center|1
|align=center|3:48
|Abu Dhabi, United Arab Emirates
|
|-
|Loss
|align=center|10–3 (1)
||Raphael Pessoa
|Decision (unanimous)
|UFC Fight Night: Maia vs. Askren
|
|align=center|3
|align=center|5:00
|Kallang, Singapore
|
|-
|NC
|align=center|10–2 (1)
|Todd Duffee
|NC (accidental eye poke)
|UFC Fight Night: Cowboy vs. Gaethje
|
|align=center|1
|align=center|4:03
|Vancouver, British Columbia, Canada
|
|-
|Loss
|align=center|10–2
|Maurice Greene
|Decision (split)
|UFC Fight Night: Lewis vs. dos Santos
|
|align=center|3
|align=center|5:00
|Wichita, Kansas, United States
|
|-
|Win
|align=center|10–1
|Josh Appelt
|TKO (punches)
|Dana White's Contender Series 14
|
|align=center|1
|align=center|4:26
|Las Vegas, Nevada, United States
|
|-
|Win
|align=center|9–1
|Maurice Greene
|Decision (unanimous)
|LFA 38
|
|align=center|5
|align=center|5:00
|Minneapolis, United States
|
|-
|Win
|align=center|8–1
|Richard Odoms
|Decision (unanimous)
|LFA 26
|
|align=center|5
|align=center|5:00
|Houston, Texas, United States
|
|-
|Win
|align=center|7–1
|Ryan Pokryfky
|Decision (unanimous)
|Big Guns 24
|
|align=center|3
|align=center|5:00
|Tallmadge, Ohio, United States
|
|-
|Loss
|align=center|6–1
|Dan Spohn
|TKO (punches)
|IT Fight Series 48
|
|align=center|5
|align=center|2:02
|Columbus, Ohio, United States
|
|-
|Win
|align=center|6–0
|John Hawk
|Decision (unanimous)
|Big Guns 18
|
|align=center|3
|align=center|5:00
|Mansfield, Ohio, United States
|
|-
|Win
|align=center|5–0
|Jason Riley
|KO (spinning back kick)
|Caged Madness 40
|
|align=center|1
|align=center|4:59
|Akron, Ohio, United States
|
|-
|Win
|align=center|4–0
|Curt Lemmon
|Decision (unanimous)
|Big Guns 16
|
|align=center|3
|align=center|5:00
|Streetsboro, Ohio, United States
|
|-
|Win
|align=center|3–0
|Ed Abrasley
|TKO (punches)
|PA Cage Fight 21
|
|align=center|1
|align=center|1:59
|Akron, Ohio, United States
|
|-
|Win
|align=center|2–0
|Leviticus Roberson
|TKO (retirement)
|RFO: Big Guns 15
|
|align=center|1
|align=center|5:00
|Akron, Ohio, United States
|
|-
|Win
|align=center|1–0
|Devon Wilson
|Submission (guillotine choke)
|Rock N Rumble 8
|
|align=center|1
|align=center|3:52
|Canton, Ohio, United States
|
|-

See also
List of male mixed martial artists

References

External links
 
 

1988 births
Heavyweight mixed martial artists
Mixed martial artists utilizing wrestling
Mixed martial artists utilizing Brazilian jiu-jitsu
Living people
American male mixed martial artists
American practitioners of Brazilian jiu-jitsu
Ultimate Fighting Championship male fighters
Sportspeople from Norfolk, Virginia
Mixed martial artists from Virginia